How to Fall Down in Public is the fourth studio album by Canadian singer-songwriter Howie Beck, released February 24, 2009. The album was a nominee for Adult Alternative Album of the Year at the 2010 Juno Awards.

Track listing
(All tracks written by Howie Beck)
 "Watch out for the Fuzz" - 3:10
 "Flashover" - 4:38
 "Save Me" - 5:00
 "Don't Put Your Arms Around Me No More" - 3:46
 "Fin" - 2:16
 "Over and Under" - 2:25
 "La La" - 3:25
 "If I Ever Come Home" - 3:30
 "Beside This Life" - 2:08

References

2009 albums
Howie Beck albums